Selliera radicans, commonly known as remuremu, swampweed or bonking grass, is a creeping, herbaceous plant species found in New Zealand, Australia and Chile.

S. radicans can grow to a height of 20 cm and spread to 2 metres wide. The shiny, narrow leaves can be up to 4 cm long, and have a spoon shape. Small, fan-shaped white flowers are produced in summer. It has been hypothesised to be the main host plant for the moth species Asaphodes frivola.

References 

Goodeniaceae
Flora of New Zealand
Flora of New South Wales
Flora of Victoria (Australia)
Flora of Tasmania
Flora of South Australia
Flora of Western Australia